Forever Young is a 2014 Chinese youth romantic drama music film directed by Lu Gengxu. It was released in China on January 10, 2014.

Cast
Pan Yueming
Lu Yulai
Qin Hao
Zhang Xiaochen
Swan Wen
Liu Zi
Du Haitao
Wang Xiaokun
Han Qiuchi
Wang Dongfang
Wang Sisi
Tan Zhuo
Yan Yikuan
Yip Sai-Wing
Zhang Qi
Cui Jian
Wang Feng

Reception
The film earned ¥2.15 million at the Chinese box office.

References

2014 romantic drama films
Chinese romantic drama films
Chinese musical films
2010s Mandarin-language films